Colin is a surname, variously derived including the given name Colin and the common name in French of some species of bird and fish.

Alexander Colin or Colyn (1527/29–1612), Flemish sculptor
Alexandre-Marie Colin (1798–1875), French painter of historical and genre subjects
André Colin (1910–1978), French politician
Andrew Colin (born 1936), British professor of computer science
Andrew Colin (financial analyst), Australian specialist in portfolio theory
Christie Colin (born 1982) American archer
Denis Colin (born 1956), French bass clarinettist and composer
Enrique Colin (born 1982), Mexican professional boxer
Fabrice Colin (born 1972), French author of fantasy, science fiction, and magic realism
Frédéric-Louis Colin (1835–1902), French-Canadian priest and educator
Georges Colin (1880–1945), French actor
Gerald Colin (1913–1995), Irish priest, Bishop of Grimsby, England
Grégoire Colin (born 1975), French actor, producer, screenwriter, and director
Gustave Colin (1814–1880), French politician.
Gustave-Henri Colin (1828–1910), French painter.
Héloïse Colin (1819–1873), French watercolorist
Ian Colin (1910–1987), British film and television actor
Jean Colin (disambiguation)
Jean-Claude Colin (1790–1875), French priest, founder of the Society of Mary
Jürgen Colin (born 1981), Dutch professional footballer
Kathryn Colin (born 1974), American sprint canoer
Letícia Colin (born 1989), Brazilian actress, singer and television presenter
Margaret Colin (born 1958), American actress
Maxime Colin (born 1991), French football player
Mike Colin (born 1971), American Recording Artist
Nathalie Colin (born 1966), French jewellery designer
Paul Colin (disambiguation)
Philippe Colin (born 1979), French sprint canoer
Richarno Colin (born 1987), Mauritian boxer
Sid Colin (1920–1989), English screenwriter
Vladimir Colin, pen-name of Jean Colin (1921–1991), Romanian short story writer and novelist

See also
Collin (disambiguation)

French-language surnames
Surnames from given names